Amblystegium tenax is a species of moss belonging to the family Amblystegiaceae.

It is native to Europe and Northern America.

References

Amblystegiaceae